Queen Mary School may refer to:

Queen Mary Elementary School, Vancouver, Canada
Queen Mary School, Mumbai, India
Queen Mary School, Lytham St Annes, Lancashire, England
Queen Mary's School, Yorkshire, England
Queen Mary's School for Boys, Basingstoke, England